General Gennady Nikolayevich Shpigun (February 5, 1947 – ca. March 2000) was the Russian Interior Ministry's special representative in Chechnya. 

He was kidnapped from the airport in Grozny on March 5, 1999, when armed masked men boarded his plane as it was about to leave for Moscow. Shpigun's kidnappers, reported at various times to be different Chechen rebel warlords (Shamil Basaev, Arbi Barayev, Magomed Khatuev), demanded a ransom of US$15 million for his release.

On March 31, 2000, his body was found in southern Chechnya, near the village of Itum-Kale.  Neither the exact cause nor the date of his death could be determined.  In June 2000, he was buried in Moscow's Preobrazhenskoe Cemetery.

References

External links
Miscalculations Paved Path to Chechen War
Gravesite information (in Russian)

People of the Chechen wars
Russian major generals
Year of death missing
1947 births
Kidnapped Russian people